Sasha Joseph Neulinger (born 1989) is an American actor and director born in Philadelphia, Pennsylvania.

Filmography
Camp Hell as Jimmy
Law & Order: Special Victims Unit  as Charlie Monaghan (1 episode, 2005)
When Zachary Beaver Came to Town (2003) as Zachary Beaver
Shallow Hal (2001)  as Young Hal Larson
The Pirates of Central Park (2001) as Bobby Walters
Unbreakable (2000) as Thermometer Boy
Rewind (2019) as director

References

1989 births
Living people
Male actors from Philadelphia